Mineral is a boundaried but unincorporated forest village in Tehama County, California, United States. It has been part of a much larger census-designated place since 1980, for which the population was 123 at the 2010 census, down from 143 at the 2000 census.

History
The community was named for mineral springs near the original town site. A post office at Mineral was established in 1894.

Geography
Mineral is located at  (40.355686, -121.567333).

Climate
Mineral experiences warm and dry summers and cool, snowy winters. According to the Köppen climate classification system, Mineral has a warm-summer Mediterranean climate (Csb).

Demographics
Mineral has been included in a census-designated place (CDP) bearing the village's name since 1980. Consequently, census-based information since then applies to the entire CDP, not just the village proper.

2010
At the 2010 census Mineral had a population of 123. The population density was 2.8 people per square mile (1.1/km). The racial makeup of Mineral was 115 (93.5%) White, 0 (0.0%) African American, 1 (0.8%) Native American, 1 (0.8%) Asian, 0 (0.0%) Pacific Islander, 1 (0.8%) from other races, and 5 (4.1%) from two or more races.  Hispanic or Latino of any race were 4 people (3.3%).

The whole population lived in households, no one lived in non-institutionalized group quarters and no one was institutionalized.

There were 64 households, 11 (17.2%) had children under the age of 18 living in them, 36 (56.3%) were opposite-sex married couples living together, 0 (0%) had a female householder with no husband present, 0 (0%) had a male householder with no wife present.  There were 3 (4.7%) unmarried opposite-sex partnerships, and 0 (0%) same-sex married couples or partnerships. 24 households (37.5%) were one person and 6 (9.4%) had someone living alone who was 65 or older. The average household size was 1.92.  There were 36 families (56.3% of households); the average family size was 2.53.

The age distribution was 19 people (15.4%) under the age of 18, 2 people (1.6%) aged 18 to 24, 21 people (17.1%) aged 25 to 44, 53 people (43.1%) aged 45 to 64, and 28 people (22.8%) who were 65 or older.  The median age was 50.8 years. For every 100 females, there were 105.0 males.  For every 100 females age 18 and over, there were 103.9 males.

There were 466 housing units at an average density of 10.5 per square mile, of the occupied units 40 (62.5%) were owner-occupied and 24 (37.5%) were rented. The homeowner vacancy rate was 4.8%; the rental vacancy rate was 4.0%.  73 people (59.3% of the population) lived in owner-occupied housing units and 50 people (40.7%) lived in rental housing units.

2000
At the 2000 census there were 143 people, 67 households, and 42 families in the CDP. The population density was 3.2 people per square mile (1.2/km). There were 450 housing units at an average density of 10.1 per square mile (3.9/km).  The racial makeup of the CDP was 96.50% White, 0.70% African American and 2.80% Native American. Hispanic or Latino of any race were 7.69%.

Of the 67 households 20.9% had children under the age of 18 living with them, 58.2% were married couples living together, 1.5% had a female householder with no husband present, and 37.3% were non-families. 32.8% of households were one person and 16.4% were one person aged 65 or older. The average household size was 2.13 and the average family size was 2.69.

The age distribution was 19.6% under the age of 18, 2.1% from 18 to 24, 25.2% from 25 to 44, 35.7% from 45 to 64, and 17.5% 65 or older. The median age was 46 years. For every 100 females, there were 107.2 males. For every 100 females age 18 and over, there were 117.0 males.

The median household income was $39,107 and the median family income  was $42,813. Males had a median income of $40,938 versus $27,083 for females. The per capita income for the CDP was $20,865. There were 10.4% of families and 12.1% of the population living below the poverty line, including 3.8% of under eighteens and 27.8% of those over 64.

Politics
In the state legislature Mineral is in the 4th Senate District, represented by Republican Doug LaMalfa, and in the 2nd Assembly District, represented by Republican Jim Nielsen.

References

Census-designated places in Tehama County, California
Census-designated places in California